Albert Morales (born May 25, 1991) is an American mixed martial artist who competes in the Bantamweight division. He has also competed in the Ultimate Fighting Championship (UFC) and of Bellator MMA.

Background
Born and raised in Southern California, Morales began training in mixed martial arts in 2013 at the age of 21. He turned to a strict training regimen in hopes of overcoming a checkered background and criminal ways. Albert Morales is of Belizean descent and proudly waves Belizean flag at UFC weigh in events.

Morales is a lifelong dedicated fan of gaming and regularly streams and plays fps games.

Mixed martial arts career
After four amateur fights, Morales made his professional debut in January 2015. He compiled an undefeated record of 6 - 0 on the regional scene in Southern California, including two stoppage victories for Bellator MMA and a decision win World Series of Fighting.

He signed with the UFC on the heels of a first round finish of Mario Israel at RFA 38 in June 2016.

Ultimate Fighting Championship
Morales made his promotional debut on September 17, 2016 at UFC Fight Night 94 where he was tabbed as a short notice replacement for Manvel Gamburyan to face Alejandro Pérez. The fight was scored a majority draw.

Morales next faced Thomas Almeida on November 19, 2016 at UFC Fight Night 100. He lost the fight via TKO in the second round.

Morales faced promotional newcomer Andre Soukhamthath on March 4, 2017 at UFC 209. He won the back-and-forth fight by split decision.

Morales was tabbed as a short notice replacement for Mitch Gagnon to face Brett Johns on July 16, 2017 at UFC Fight Night 113. He lost the bout by unanimous decision.

Morales faced Benito Lopez on December 9, 2017 at UFC Fight Night 123. He lost the back-and-forth fight by unanimous decision.

Morales faced promotional newcomer Manny Bermudez on February 24, 2018 at UFC on Fox 28. He lost the fight via submission in the second round.

On August 14, 2018, it was announced that Morales was released from UFC.

Post-UFC career
Morales faced James Barnes at Golden Boy Promotions' inaugural MMA event on November 24, 2018. He lost the fight via an armbar. Subsequently, Morales decided to change his camp to Black House.

Morales next fought Carlos Puente Jr. at CXF 17 on March 9, 2019. He won the fight via first round submission.

Lights Out Xtreme Fighting
In early 2019, Morales signed with Shawne Merriman's new promotion Lights Out Xtreme Fighting. Morales headlined the inaugural LXF 1 event against Alfred Khaskakyan on May 11, 2019. The bout was for the inaugural LXF Bantamweight Championship, however Khaskakyan missed weight, making him ineligible for the title. Morales lost the fight via first-round knockout.

Morales made his sophomore appearance in the promotion against Ron Scolesdang in a bantamweight title eliminator bout at LXF 3 on September 21, 2019. He won the fight via first-round knockout.

Morales got his second change at the LXF Bantamweight Championship against Ryan Lilley at LXF 4 on November 15, 2019. He claimed the title with a third-round doctor stoppage.

Morales was expected to defend his title in a rematch against Ryan Lilley at LXF 5 on March 13, 2020. However, the event was tentatively rescheduled to be held on April 24, 2020 due to the COVID-19 pandemic.

Bellator MMA 
Morales, as a replacement for James Gallagher, faced Patchy Mix at Bellator 258 on May 7, 2021. He lost the bout via arm-triangle choke in the third round.

Return to Lights Out Xtreme Fighting
Morales faced Victor Henry at LXF 6 on October 30, 2021. He lost the bout via rear-naked choke in the second round.

Up Next Fighting
Morales faced Ryan Lilly at UNF 1 on May 21, 2022. He won via unanimous decision in the three round main event.

Morales faced Terrion Ware for the UNF Featherweight Championship on August 20, 2022 at UNF 2. He won the bout via arm-triangle choke in the third round.

Championships and accomplishments
Lights Out Xtreme Fighting
Lights Out Xtreme Fighting Bantamweight Champion (One time; augural)
Up Next Fighting
UNF Featherweight Championship (One time; augural)

Mixed martial arts record

|-
|Loss
|align=center|12–9–1
|Javier Garcia
|Decision (unanimous)
|UNF 5
|
|align=center|3
|align=center|5:00
|Commerce, California, United States
|
|-
|Win
|align=center|12–8–1
|Terrion Ware
|Submission (arm-triangle choke)
|UNF 2
|
|align=center|3
|align=center|1:28
|Commerce, California, United States
|
|-
|Win
|align=center|11–8–1
|Ryan Lilley
|Decision (unanimous)
|UNF 1
|
|align=center|3
|align=center|5:00
|Burbank, California, United States
|
|-
|Loss
|align=center|10–8–1
|Victor Henry
|Submission (rear-naked choke)
|LXF 6
|
|align=center|2
|align=center|1:46
|Burbank, California, United States
|
|-
|Loss
|align=center|10–7–1
|Patchy Mix
|Submission (arm-triangle choke)
|Bellator 258
|
|align=center|3
|align=center|2:40
|Uncasville, Connecticut, United States
|
|-
|Win
|align=center|
|Ryan Lilley
|TKO (doctor stoppage)
|LXF 4
|
|align=center|3
|align=center|0:03
|Burbank, California, United States
|
|-
|Win
|align=center|9–6–1
|Ron Scolesdang
|TKO (punches)
|LXF 3
|
|align=center|1
|align=center|4:50
|Commerce, California, United States
|
|-
|Loss
|align=center|8–6–1
|Alfred Khashakyan
|TKO (punches)
|LXF 1
|
|align=center|1
|align=center|3:58
|Burbank, California, United States
|
|-
|Win
|align=center|8–5–1
|Carlos Puente Jr.
|Submission (rear-naked choke)
|CXF 17
|
|align=center|1
|align=center|1:30
|Los Angeles, California, United States
|
|-
|Loss
|align=center|7–5–1
|James Barnes
|Submission (armbar)
|Golden Boy Promotions: Liddell vs. Ortiz 3
|
|align=center|3
|align=center|4:09
|Inglewood, California, United States
|
|-
|Loss
|align=center|7–4–1
|Manny Bermudez
|Submission (guillotine choke)
|UFC on Fox: Emmett vs. Stephens 
|
|align=center|2
|align=center|2:33
|Orlando, Florida, United States
|
|-
|Loss
|align=center|7–3–1
|Benito Lopez
|Decision (unanimous)
|UFC Fight Night: Swanson vs. Ortega 
|
|align=center|3
|align=center|5:00
|Fresno, California, United States
|
|-
|Loss
|align=center|7–2–1
|Brett Johns
|Decision (unanimous)
|UFC Fight Night: Nelson vs. Ponzinibbio 
|
|align=center|3
|align=center|5:00
|Glasgow, Scotland
|
|-
|Win
|align=center|7–1–1
|Andre Soukhamthath
|Decision (split)
|UFC 209
|
|align=center|3
|align=center|5:00
|Las Vegas, Nevada, United States
|
|-
|Loss
|align=center|6–1–1 
|Thomas Almeida
|TKO (punches)
|UFC Fight Night: Bader vs. Nogueira 2
|
|align=center|2
|align=center|1:37
|São Paulo, Brazil
|
|-
|Draw
|align=center|6–0–1
|Alejandro Pérez
|Draw (majority)
|UFC Fight Night: Poirier vs. Johnson
|
|align=center|3
|align=center|5:00
|Hidalgo, Texas, United States
|
|-
|Win
|align=center| 6–0
|Mario Israel
|KO (punch)
|RFA 38
|
|align=center| 1
|align=center| 0:20
|Costa Mesa, California, United States
| 
|-
|Win
|align=center| 5–0
|Anthony Paredes
|Decision (unanimous)
|WSOF 28
|
|align=center| 3
|align=center| 5:00
|Garden Grove, California, United States
|
|-
|Win
|align=center| 4–0
|Kurt Weinrich
|Submission (triangle choke)
|WFC 16
|
|align=center|1
|align=center|2:31
|Sacramento, California, United States
|
|-
|Win
|align=center| 3–0
|David Suruy
|Submission (triangle choke)
|BAMMA USA 17
|
|align=center|1
|align=center|0:59
|Commerce, California, United States
|
|-
|Win
|align=center| 2–0
|John Yoo
|TKO (punches)
|Bellator 137
|
|align=center|3
|align=center|1:37
|Temecula, California, United States
|
|-
|Win
|align=center| 1–0
|Fabian Gonzalez
|Submission (rear-naked choke)
|Bellator 132
|
|align=center|2
|align=center|3:12
|Temecula, California, United States
|
|-

See also
 List of male mixed martial artists

References

External links
 
 

1991 births
American male mixed martial artists
Bantamweight mixed martial artists
Mixed martial artists utilizing Brazilian jiu-jitsu
Living people
Mixed martial artists from California
American people of Belizean descent
American mixed martial artists of Mexican descent
People from Granada Hills, Los Angeles
People from Reseda, Los Angeles
People from Los Angeles County, California
Ultimate Fighting Championship male fighters
American practitioners of Brazilian jiu-jitsu